Christian Breuer (born 3 November 1976) is a German former speed skater. He competed at the 1998 Winter Olympics and the 2002 Winter Olympics.

References

External links
 

1976 births
Living people
German male speed skaters
Olympic speed skaters of Germany
Speed skaters at the 1998 Winter Olympics
Speed skaters at the 2002 Winter Olympics
Sportspeople from Krefeld